Abona was one of nine menceyatos guanches (native kingdoms) that has divided the island of Tenerife after the death of mencey Tinerfe, in the days before the conquest of the islands by the Crown of Castile. 

Occupied by the extension of existing municipalities Fasnia, Arico, Granadilla de Abona, San Miguel de Abona, Vilaflor as well as part of Arona, menceys were Atguaxoña and Adxoña (or Adjona).

References

External links 
 Menceyatos de Tenerife

Abona
Former kingdoms